Nauer is a surname of German origin, originating as an occupational name for a ferryman. Notable people with the surname include:

Daria Nauer (born 1966), Swiss retired long-distance runner
Thomas Nauer (1910-1953), Samoan politician

See also
Neuer (surname)
Nauert

Surnames of German origin